William Nast may refer to:
 William Nast (Methodist) (1807–1899), German-American religious leader and editor
 William F. Nast (1840–1893), American business manager